The following outline is provided as an overview of and topical guide to sexual ethics:

Sexual ethics – branch of philosophy that explores the moral obligations, and permissibility, or impermissibility of sexual activities. Also deals with issues arising from all aspects of sexuality and human sexual behaviour relating to the community and personal standards regarding the conduct of interpersonal relationships, including issues of consent, sexual relations before marriage and/or while married, including the issues of marital fidelity and premarital and non-marital sex, sexual orientation, and more.

What type of thing is sexual ethics? 

Sexual ethics can be described as all of the following:

 A branch of philosophy –
 A branch of ethics –
 A branch of philosophy of sex – part of applied philosophy studying sex and love. It includes both ethics of phenomena such as prostitution, rape, sexual harassment, sexual identity, the age of consent, and homosexuality, and conceptual analysis of concepts such as "what is sex"?

History of sexual ethics 

 History of human sexuality
 Sexual Revolution

Ethical issues involving sex 

 Contraception; varieties of, technologies in
 Contraceptive security
 Unintended pregnancy
 Abortion
 Safe sex
 Sexually transmitted infections (STIs)
 Reproductive rights
 Genital modification and mutilation
 Circumcision
 Female genital mutilation (FGM)
 Adoption
 Family
 Incest
 Sexual harassment
 Sexual abuse—definitions of, statistics about, strategies for preventing, legal and moral questions about
 Rape and consent

Issues pertaining to age groups 

 Child sexuality
 Child marriage
 Child pornography
 Child prostitution
 Adolescent sexuality: and all the other topics included on this list
 Adolescent sexuality in the United States
 Teenage pregnancy
 Sexuality in older age

Issues pertaining to love and sex 
 Unrequited love
 Polyamory

Issues pertaining to religion and sex 
 Religion and Sexuality
 Catholicism and sexuality
 Chastity
 Homosexuality and religion
 Tantrism
 Religious views on birth control
 Christian views on contraception

Sexual ethics concepts

Dating and marriage 
 Marriage—how the love described above is or is not related to the permissibility or forbiddenness of sex; what kind of commitment it is that is central to marriage.
 Polygamy
 Polygyny
 Polyandry
 Extramarital sex
 Adultery
 Divorce
 Infidelity

Homosexuality 

Homosexuality
 Gays and Gay sex
 Lesbians and Lesbian sex
 Bisexuals
 Transgender individuals and Transsexualism

Paraphilias 
 Paraphilias
 List of paraphilias
 Fetishism
 Coprophilia
 Exhibitionism
 Necrophilia
 Pedophilia - sexual attraction to children.
 Zoophilia - sexual attraction to animals.

Sex acts 
 Various sex methods
 BDSM
 Sexual positions
 Swinging
 Various combinations of people having sex
 Threesome
 Orgy
 Group sex
 Gang Bang
 Types of sex and sex-like acts
 Oral sex
 Anal sex
 Double penetration
 Coitus
 Kiss
 Masturbation—frequency of; techniques of

Sexual ethics organizations

Sexual ethics publications

Books on sexual ethics 
 Primoratz, Igor.  Ethics and Sex.  New York: Routledge, 1999.

Persons influential in sexual ethics

See also 

 Virginity
 Casual sex or "Hooking up"; one night stand
 Frequency of sex and cooperation between sexual partners
 Libido/sex drive, sexual desire, lust
 Sexism
 Feminism and sex: has influenced many aspects of (particularly western) cultural views about sex
 Gender roles
 Animal sexual behaviour, including masturbation and the majority of other topics on this list: the implications for the obligatoriness, permissibility, or forbiddenness of such behaviors in humans
 Sodomy
 Indecent exposure
 Pornography

References

External links 

 Bertrand Russell. Our Sexual Ethics, 1936
 Janet Smith. Natural Law and Sexual Ethics
 Philosophy of sexuality. Internet Encyclopedia of Philosophy

Sexual ethics
Sexual ethics
Philosophy of sexuality
Sexuality and society